"Just for What I Am" is a single by American country music artist Connie Smith. Released in February 1972, the song reached #5 on the Billboard Hot Country Singles chart. The song was issued onto Smith's 1972 album entitled Ain't We Havin' Us a Good Time. In addition, "Just for What I Am" peaked at #4 on the Canadian RPM Country Tracks chart around the same time.

Charts

Weekly charts

Year-end charts

References 

1972 singles
Connie Smith songs
Songs written by Dallas Frazier
Song recordings produced by Bob Ferguson (musician)
Songs written by A.L. "Doodle" Owens